Riku Lätti (11 June 1973), is a South African singer, songwriter and writer.  After Riku matriculated in 1991 at Hoërskool Florida, Johannesburg, Gauteng Province, he studied philosophy at University of the Witwatersrand where he finished his honours degree. He changed his name to Victor S. Wolf and claimed that Riku Latti is "dead".  Since then he composed the complete film score for Jans Rautenbach's film "Abraham" on which he was credited as Riku Lätti, thereby being effectively resurrected.

In South Africa Riku collaborated with superstars such as Koos Kombuis, Laurika Rauch, Frazer Barry, Churchil Naudé, David Kramer, Stef Bos, Paul Riekert among others.  His songs have been performed and recorded by people like Karla du Plessis, Laurika Rauch, Bobby van Jaarsveld, the all-girl punk band The Pheobes and the jazz outfit Tsunami and Izak Davel.

In 2005, he broke onto the international music scene when he completed his first tour in  Belgium and the Netherlands.  In 2006 during a follow-up tour through Europe he performed with Stef Bos. On October 1, 2007, Lätti releases his first album in the Benelux (Akoesties). For this album he re-recorded some of his best songs in a stripped-down version, using only his voice and a piano or a guitar.

Riku together with Jahn Beukes wrote the music for the award-winning SABC television series Hopeville.  Hopeville won the prestigious Rose d'Or in Switzerland for best international TV series.  It was also nominated for an Emmy Award. Other scores include the soundtrack for KykNet series Wie lê waar and the drama series Vlug na Egipte.

He won a South African Film and Television Award (SAFTA) for his sound design and film score for the feature film Die Wonderlike Avonture van Hanna Hoekom.

Other awards Riku has won include 2 GMT (Geraas Musiektoekennings).  (The first for best Alternative Artist for his album Pleister vir my Nerwe.  The second for best male vocalist for his album Aan't sterre tel.)  And a Vonk Music award for his album Die President se keuse.

His greatest work collaborative album Radio Lava with Jahn Beukes and Arnaud van Vliet featuring original work He accused the South African media of not having transformed after the end of Apartheid.

He is also the chief in charge of zimdollar, an Afrikaans cult newspaper.
He is the founding father of Die Wasgoedlyn.

Die Wasgoedlyn
A few years ago Riku Lätti started recording many different artists all around South Africa. Wherever he went he took his recording equipment with and before he knew it artists started featuring on each other's tracks, collaborating and performing together, and so Die Wasgoedlyn started and Die Wasgoedlyn CD was released in 2015. Die Wasgoedlyn (The Washing Line) is a concept centering around Afrikaans musicians telling and singing their stories in their natural habitat: at their homes, around braais, with friends. These informal gatherings are recorded by Riku Lätti with his mobile studio set-up ensuring that the music is not overproduced in a studio giving a sense of the real and the unpretentious.

The name, Die Wasgoedlyn (The Washing Line), was chosen for two reasons. The first being that a washing line (in literal terms) is not usually a place where you would take your guests. It is usually in your backyard where things are a lot less presentable than the front (street view) of your house. In the same vain Die Wasgoedlyn attempts to unearth these raw performances of artists in a space (mentally and physically) that they take comfort in - in which they do not have to pretend. The second reason is that on a washing line you'll find a large variety of items, from work-shirts to church-blouses, patched socks, vest with holes in it, underwear from Jockey, petticoats, etc. Die Wasgoedlyn is as much about putting the artist in their most natural surrounding as it is about surrounding them with other artists - enabling the somewhat mystical bond between creatives to flourish resulting in instinctive collaborations.

In 2014 Riku Lätti collaborated with Kilroy Was Here! Productions (Charl J. Naudé and Gideon Breytenbach) in attempts to turn Die Wasgoedlyn into a TV series with the same concept. The first season will feature approximately twenty artists including Lochner de Kock, Ryno Velvet, Willim Welsyn, Frazer Barry, Tribal Echo, Piet Botha, Jacques "Jake Gunn" Groenewald, Dana Snyman, Gert Vlok Nel, Jannie du Toit, C. Johan Bakkes, Churchill Naude, Laurinda Hofmeyr, Andre van Rensburg, Rian Malan, Dozi, Leila Groenewald, Mervin Williams, Adries Bezuidenhout, Fran Veda (Bonsai), Charles J. Fourie, Andra, Gerald Clark, Mauritz Lotz, Les Javan, Riku Lätti, Bacchus Nel, Loit Sôls, Francois van Coke (Van Coke Kartel), etc.

Discography
Me and Mr. Sane
Electric Chair
Hey hey hey hey
Seveneight
Crazy like a bird
Muscatoman
Cool Kids
99
Everything
One fine day
Featuring musicians Peter Auret, Max Loubscher, Justy Range, Willem Moller (who played with Johannes Kerkorrel) and Stefan Ackermann

Pleister vir my nerwe
Sterre
Rooirok
Pakpoort
Onder my asem
Jas
Agter my rug
Valley
Verander
Stuikel
Waar is jy
Laughing
Featuring musicians Peter Auret, Max Mikula, Brendan Ou Tim, Bob Biggens Hendrik Coetzee
The album won the GMT Award for Best Alternative Afrikaans Album

WOKNAKWYF!
Slaap
In die begin
Reën
Moet nooit die belangrikheid van goeie mond higiëne onderskat nie
Slaap maar weer

Jean Marais - Nou
Aan almal
Saamstaan
Dis te laf
Suit
Staar
Nou
Hoekom is jy bang vir my
Eiland in die son
Die laaste wals
Tussen my en jou
The album was a collaboration between Riku and Jean Marais (MoShang) with contributions from Ewald Cress.  It was hailed by the media as "the most progressive Afrikaans album ever".

Aan't sterre tel (2004)
Oorlogtyd
Medisyne mens - with Steve Hofmeyr
My Amerika
Op die maan - with Laurika Rauch
Staar
Waar is jy
Verander
Osama Bin Laden - with Paul Riekert
Soms - with Liela Groenewald
Deesdae
Smoorverlief
Featuring musicians Peter Auret, Jonathan Crossley, Cesare Cassarino, Rory Gaddin
The album won Riku the GMT Award for best male vocalist.

Radio Lava (2007)
Afgrond
Strate
Eenling Is Die Mens Gebore
Hekkie
Hoofstroom
Om En Om
Onthou Jy Nog
Blom
Ysbeer
Die Cool Wat Deur Die Kerk Is
Sneeuwitjie Se Partytjie
Voor Jou Oe
Weet Van Beter
Jeane Se Partytjie
Featuring Jahn Beukes and Arnaud van Vliet.

Akoesties (2009)
Hoofstroom
Ysbeer
Pakpoort
Afgrond
Somer
Blom
Voor Jou Oë
Aubade II
Stertrap
Strate
Sunday's Like This
My Amerika
Onder Jou Asem
Op Die Maan - with Jelle Amersfoort
Dood Spoort (hidden track by Jelle Amersfoort, Dutch translation of Hoofstroom)
Benelux-release only, acoustic recordings with Riku on piano and guitar.

Die Ongelooflike avonture van Hanna Hoekom (2010)
Original soundtrack for the film available from Gallo Records
Ratelslang
Hoekom Altyd
Huis
Virus
Pak Saam
Konigin Binne
Wonder
Raaisel
Rooirok
My Kap
Weet Jy (Dat ek nog aan jou klou)
Suikerbostango
Jêm
Nuwe Lewe
Dis 'n Dogtertjie
Konigin Binne (&0s Rules Mix)

Janneman in die Diereryk (2011)
Kinderalbum/Children's album
Stories and songs available from AKA Records
Stoomtrein
Janneman
Vertelling- In die takke
Oupa Die Uil
Vertelling - Waar Gaan Al Die Diere Heen
Koning Leeu Se Partytjie
Slaap, Hasie, Slaap
Skildpad In My Hangmat
Vir Die Voëls
Vertelling -'n Slang In Die Stad
In Die Woud
Vêr Weg Van Die Huis
Elke Dier Het Sy Dag
Swaeltjie
Vertelling - Janneman Gaan Huis Toe
'n Ding Soos Die
Vertelling - Hoekom Moes Janneman Weggaan
As Al Die Sterre Stukkend VAl
Droomland

Die Wasgoedlyn Volume 01 (2015)
Verskeie Kaalpruts - Wasgoedlyn
Gert Vlok Nel - Fly My To The Moon
Rian Malan - Jezebel
Les Javan - Rooirokmoles
Bacchus Nel - Lucy
Nike Holm - Seil
Loit Sôls - Die Law
Lochner de Kock - Die Muur
Gert Vlok Nel - Hand Vol Gruis
Piet Botha - Bitterfontein
Oom Koos - Sarie Marais
Les Javan - Rietfontein
Bacchus Nel - Waar Die Dice Val
Neil Sandilands - Stof Tot Stof
Jackie Lätti - Boereplaas se Lakens
Die White Ou Not Kwaito Ensemble - Boegoeberg se Dam
Toast Coetzer - Sagte Vleise
Jaco Botha - Saggies en Teer
Rynier Ernst Julius Prins - Groot Verlange
Jackie Lätti - Laaste Dans
Laurinda Hofmeyr - Al In Die Rondte
Riku Lätti - Slaap Klein Beminde
Verskeie Kaalpruts - Onder Jou Asem
Verskeie Kaalpruts - Wasgoedlyn Tot Siens Sê

Die klankbaan van Jans Rautenbach film - Abraham (2015)
Original soundtrack for the film, available from Vonk Musiek.
Treinspoor
Dwarrelwind Van My Lewe
Lyperplant
Fyntrapriel
Bergwind
Springbok
Stofpadriel
Triomftog
Twee-Paaie-Riel
Op Na Die Berge
Tyd Vir Kuns
Leeu In Die Sitkamer
Sy Bloed
Olifant
Iemand Wat My Hoor
Katie Se Byl
Langs 'n Stofpad Vêr
Waai
Heilig Is Die Lewe
Op Na Die Berge (Bonus Snit)
Hidden Track

References  

1973 births
Afrikaans-language singers
Living people
21st-century South African male singers